JDE Peet's is an American-Dutch company that owns beverage brands, mostly of coffee, tea and hot chocolate. It was formed in 2015 following the merger of the coffee division of Mondelez International with Douwe Egberts as Jacobs Douwe Egberts. The stock of JDE Peet's is listed on the Euronext Amsterdam stock exchange.

History

Beginnings
The company has its origins in De Witte Os, a general grocery shop that Egbert Douwes established in 1753 in Joure, Frisia, the Netherlands. In 1780, the company was transferred to his eldest son Douwe Egberts. It developed into a company dealing in coffee, tea, and tobacco. By 1925 it had changed its name to Douwe Egberts (as in Douwe, the son of Egbert), and had introduced the red seal as its logo.

International expansions
In 1948, the company began to sell its products in Belgium, followed by France, Spain and Denmark. It founded a new holding company, Douwe Egberts Koninklijke ("Royal Douwe Egberts") in 1968, and a year later took over the Dutch coffee manufacturer Kanis & Gunnink.

The company expanded through Europe, acquiring other tea, coffee and tobacco companies, such as the UK tea distributor Horniman's Tea.

Sara Lee 
In 1978 Douwe Egberts was taken over by Consolidated Foods Corporation, later the Sara Lee Corporation. In 1989, Douwe Egberts purchased Van Nelle, its main Dutch competitor in coffee, tea and tobacco. It sold its tobacco interests, including Van Nelle and Drum rolling tobacco, to Imperial Tobacco in 1998.

In 2001, the company collaborated with Philips to produce the Senseo coffee maker. The following year it established the Douwe Egberts Foundation, an independent entity that initiates and manages coffee and tea projects in countries of origin.

Douwe Egberts sued the province of Groningen in 2007 over the introduction of rules stating that all coffee supplied in the province must meet Fair trade criteria set by Stichting Max Havelaar. Courts ruled in favour of the province of Groningen.

With profits from the coffee division under threat from rivals such as Nestlé and Kraft, and being unable to find a buyer, in 2012 Sara Lee split off the coffee division into D.E Master Blenders 1753, offering share-holders one share in the new company for each main share they held. The main Sara Lee company changed its name to Hillshire Brands.

D.E to Mondelez 
In 2012 Douwe Egberts became an independent Dutch company again, trading under the name D.E Master Blenders 1753 NV.

In 2013, the German investor group JAB Holding Company made an offer to purchase D.E Master Blenders 1753 for $9.8 billion. The company appointed a new management and delisted the company from the Euronext stock market. D.E. Master Blenders 1753 later bought Norway's Kaffehuset Friele coffee manufacturer.

In May 2014 the company announced plans to merge with the coffee division of American food conglomerate Mondelez International. The merger received approval from the European Commissioner for Competition Margrethe Vestager on 5 May 2015, subject to several conditions. These included a requirement that Merrild and Carte Noire brands were sold (now owned by competitor Luigi Lavazza S.p.A.), and that the Senseo brand in Austria was licensed to a competitor.

Merger with Peet’s Coffee and IPO 
Jacobs Douwe Egberts merged with Peet's Coffee, another coffee business owned by JAB Holding, to form JDE Peet's which would own the Peet's chain, as well as brands including: Jacobs Coffee, Douwe Egberts, Moccona, Super Coffee, Owl Coffee, OldTown White Coffee, Kenco and Pickwick, and brewing systems including Senseo and Tassimo. The company was listed in Amsterdam in May 2020.

Brands
Brands owned by the company include:

 Bell Tea (New Zealand)
 Bravo
 Caboclo (Brazil)
 Café do Ponto (Brazil)
 Café HAG
 Café Pelé (Brazil)
 Café Prima
 Cafe Switch (a frothy coffee drink that is frothed using thumb pods)
 Campos Coffee
 Caffiato (an iced cappuccino with caramel flavour) 
 Cafitesse (coffee concentrates and systems)
 Chat Noir
 Damasco (Brazil)
 Douwe Egberts (ground and instant coffee; also Douwe Egberts Coffee Systems and Coffee Care, a drinks supply)
 DE Karaván
 DE Omnia
 DE Paloma
 Friele (Norway)
 Gevalia (Sweden)
 Grand Mère
 Harris (coffee and filter papers in Australia)
 Horniman's Tea
 Hummingbird (New Zealand)
 Jacobs
 Jacqmotte
 Jacques Vabre
 Kanis & Gunnink (coffee)
 Kenco
 Les 2 Marmottes (France) 
 L'OR
 Maison du Café (coffee, in France)
 Marcilla (Spain)
 Mastro Lorenzo
 Maxwell House
 Moccona (instant coffee)
 Moka (Brazil)
 Natreen (artificial sweeteners)
 OldTown White Coffee (Malaysia)
 Owl Coffee (Singapore)
 Piazza d'Oro (espresso)
 Pickwick tea
 Pilão (Brazil)
 Saimaza (Spain)
 Seleto (Brazil)
 Senseo (coffee-pads for a coffee-maker, in conjunction with Philips)
 Splendid
 Super Coffee (Singapore)
 Tassimo
 Tea Forte

References

 https://www.thestar.com.my/business/business-news/2017/12/11/dutch-company-launches-takeover-of-oldtown-for-rm1pt47b/

External links

 

 
Dutch companies established in 2015
Food and drink companies established in 2015
Companies listed on Euronext Amsterdam